The 1955 Giro di Lombardia, 49th edition of the race, was held on October 23, 1955, in Milan, Italy with a total distance of 222 km (~137.9 miles).

116 cyclists started from Milan, 91 of them had completed the race.

General classification

Final general classification

References

1955
1955 in road cycling
1955 in Italian sport
1955 Challenge Desgrange-Colombo